Peter Li may be:

Peter Li Hongye (1920–2011), Chinese Roman Catholic bishop
Peter Wai-Kwong Li (born 1952), mathematician at University of California, Irvine
Zhi Cong Li (born 1993), Chinese racing driver

See also
Peter Lee (disambiguation)